Clyde Evans (June 26, 1938 – August 11, 2021) was an American politician who served as a Republican member of the Ohio House of Representatives, who represented the 87th district from 2003 to 2010. Term limited in 2010, he ran for the Ohio Senate, but lost the primary election to David T. Daniels.

He died on August 11, 2021, in Gallipolis, Ohio, at age 83.

References

External links
Clyde Evans for State Senate official campaign website

1938 births
2021 deaths
Republican Party members of the Ohio House of Representatives
21st-century American politicians
University of Southern Mississippi alumni
Eastern Kentucky University alumni
Union College (New York) alumni
People from Gallia County, Ohio